12 The Shambles is an historic building in the English city of York, North Yorkshire.

A building was constructed on the site in about 1400, probably being T-shaped and set a little off the street.  In the late 15th century, a new three-storey building was constructed in front of the existing house.  In the 16th century, the front part of the rear building was replaced with a two-storey building with attics, adjoining the front block.

In the early 18th century, the building was refronted in brick, removing the jettying of the timber framed structure.  The building was further altered in the 19th century.  In the 20th century, work at the rear removed the last remnants of the building from 1400, and a new shopfront was added on the ground floor, facing onto The Shambles.  In 1954, it was grade II* listed.

As of 2020, the building is occupied by York Vikings, with Guest Walker & Co Solicitors on the upper floors at 12A.

References

12
Houses in North Yorkshire
Buildings and structures in North Yorkshire
15th-century establishments in England
Grade II* listed buildings in York
Grade II* listed houses
15th century in York